Norman Ortega (born 18 December 1969) is a Nicaraguan sports shooter. He competed in the men's 10 metre air pistol event at the 1992 Summer Olympics. 

He trained the pistol olimpic team of El Salvador for more than 10 years and works training the ANSP (National Academy of public Security). 
Is the personal coach of many champions and good shooters of IPSC in El Salvador. 
He is now married and has children.
Actually works in his own company making Tactical Holsters made by Kydex, @HolsterDefensesv.

References

1969 births
Living people
Nicaraguan male sport shooters
Olympic shooters of Nicaragua
Shooters at the 1992 Summer Olympics
Place of birth missing (living people)